The 1975 Men's European Volleyball Championship was the ninth edition of the event, organized by Europe's governing volleyball body, the Confédération Européenne de Volleyball. It was hosted in Skopje Kraljevo Subotica cities in Yugoslavia from October 18 to October 25, 1975, with the final round held in Belgrade.

Teams

Group A – Skopje

Group B – Subotica

Group C – Kraljevo

Preliminary round

Final round

Final ranking

References
 Results

Men's European Volleyball Championships
E
Volleyball Championship
V
V
1970s in Belgrade
October 1975 sports events in Europe